The Gupta Empire was an ancient Indian empire which existed from the early 4th century CE to late 6th century CE. At its zenith, from approximately 319 to 467 CE, it covered much of the Indian subcontinent. This period is considered as the Golden Age of India by historians. The ruling dynasty of the empire was founded by the king Sri Gupta; the most notable rulers of the dynasty were Chandragupta I, Samudragupta, Chandragupta II and Skandagupta. The 5th-century CE Sanskrit poet Kalidasa credits the Guptas with having conquered about twenty-one kingdoms, both in and outside India, including the kingdoms of Parasikas, the Hunas, the Kambojas, tribes located in the west and east Oxus valleys, the Kinnaras, Kiratas, and others.

The high points of this period are the great cultural developments which took place primarily during the reigns of Samudragupta, Chandragupta II and Kumaragupta I. Many Hindu epics and literary sources, such as Mahabharata and Ramayana, were canonised during this period. The Gupta period produced scholars such as Kalidasa, Aryabhata, Varahamihira, and Vatsyayana who made great advancements in many academic fields. Science and political administration reached new heights during the Gupta era. The period gave rise to achievements in architecture, sculpture, and painting that "set standards of form and taste [that] determined the whole subsequent course of art, not only in India but far beyond her borders". Strong trade ties also made the region an important cultural centre and established the region as a base that would influence nearby kingdoms and regions in India and Southeast Asia. The Puranas, earlier long poems on a variety of subjects, are also thought to have been committed to written texts around this period. Hinduism was followed by the rulers and the Brahmins flourished in the Gupta empire but the Guptas tolerated people of other faiths as well.

The empire eventually died out because of factors such as substantial loss of territory and imperial authority caused by their own erstwhile feudatories, as well as the invasion by the Huna peoples (Kidarites and Alchon Huns) from Central Asia. After the collapse of the Gupta Empire in the 6th century, India was again ruled by numerous regional kingdoms.

Origin

The homeland of the Guptas is uncertain. According to one theory, they originated in the present-day lower-Doab region of Uttar Pradesh, where most of the inscriptions and coin hoards of the early Gupta kings have been discovered. This theory is also supported by the Purana, as argued by the proponents, that mention the territory of the early Gupta kings as Prayaga, Saketa, and Magadha areas in the Ganges basin.

Another prominent theory locates the Gupta homeland in the present-day Bengal region in Ganges basin, based on the account of the 7th-century Chinese Buddhist monk Yijing. According to Yijing, king Che-li-ki-to (identified with the dynasty's founder Shri Gupta) built a temple for Chinese pilgrims near Mi-li-kia-si-kia-po-no (apparently a transcription of Mriga-shikha-vana). Yijing states that this temple was located more than 40 yojanas east of Nalanda, which would mean it was situated somewhere in the modern Bengal region. Another proposal is that the early Gupta kingdom extended from Prayaga in the west to northern Bengal in the east.

The Gupta records do not mention the dynasty's varna (social class). Some historians, such as A.S. Altekar, have theorised that they were of Vaishya origin, as certain ancient Indian texts prescribe the name "Gupta" for the members of the Vaishya varna. According to historian R. S. Sharma, the Vaishyas – who were traditionally associated with trade – may have become rulers after resisting oppressive taxation by the previous rulers. Critics of the Vaishya-origin theory point out that the suffix Gupta features in the names of several non-Vaishyas before as well as during the Gupta period, and the dynastic name "Gupta" may have simply derived from the name of the family's first king Gupta. Some scholars, such as S. R. Goyal, theorise that the Guptas were Brahmanas, because they had matrimonial relations with Brahmans, but others reject this evidence as inconclusive. Based on the Pune and Riddhapur inscriptions of the Gupta princess Prabhavati-gupta, some scholars believe that the name of her paternal gotra (clan) was "Dharana", but an alternative reading of these inscriptions suggests that Dharana was the gotra of her mother Kuberanaga.

Nepali scholar D. R. Regmi links the imperial Guptas with the Abhira Guptas of Nepal, noting that excavations in Nepal and Deccan have revealed that the Gupta suffix was common among Abhira kings.

History

Early rulers 

Gupta (Gupta script:  gu-pta, fl. late 3rd century CE) is the earliest known king of the dynasty: different historians variously date the beginning of his reign from mid-to-late 3rd century CE. Sri Gupta founded the Gupta Empire c. 240-280 CE, and was succeeded by his son, Ghatotkacha, c. 280-319 CE, followed by Ghatotkacha’s son, Chandragupta, c. 319-335 CE."Che-li-ki-to", the name of a king mentioned by the 7th century Chinese Buddhist monk Yijing, is believed to be a transcription of "Shri-Gupta" (IAST: Śrigupta), "Shri" being an honorific prefix. According to Yijing, this king built a temple for Chinese Buddhist pilgrims near "Mi-li-kia-si-kia-po-no" (believed to be a transcription of Mṛgaśikhāvana).

In the Allahabad Pillar inscription, Gupta and his successor Ghatotkacha are described as Maharaja ("great king"), while the next king Chandragupta I is called a Maharajadhiraja ("king of great kings"). In the later period, the title Maharaja was used by feudatory rulers, which has led to suggestions that Gupta and Ghatotkacha were vassals (possibly of Kushan Empire). However, there are several instances of paramount sovereigns using the title Maharaja, in both pre-Gupta and post-Gupta periods, so this cannot be said with certainty. That said, there is no doubt that Gupta and Ghatotkacha held a lower status and were less powerful than Chandragupta I.

Chandragupta I married the Licchavi princess Kumaradevi, which may have helped him extend his political power and dominions, enabling him to adopt the imperial title Maharajadhiraja. According to the dynasty's official records, he was succeeded by his son Samudragupta. However, the discovery of the coins issued by a Gupta ruler named Kacha have led to some debate on this topic: according to one theory, Kacha was another name for Samudragupta; another possibility is that Kacha was a rival claimant to the throne.

Samudragupta

Samudragupta succeeded his father around 335 or 350 CE, and ruled until c. 375 CE. The Allahabad Pillar inscription, composed by his courtier Harishena, credits him with extensive conquests. The inscription asserts that Samudragupta uprooted 8 kings of Āryāvarta, the northern region, including the Nagas. It further claims that he subjugated all the kings of the forest region, which was most probably located in central India. It also credits him with defeating 12 rulers of Dakshinapatha, the southern region: the exact identification of several of these kings is debated among modern scholars, but it is clear that these kings ruled areas located on the eastern coast of India. The inscription suggests that Samudragupta advanced as far as the Pallava kingdom in the south, and defeated Vishnugopa, the Pallava regent of Kanchi. During this southern campaign, Samudragupta most probably passed through the forest tract of central India, reached the eastern coast in present-day Odisha, and then marched south along the coast of the Bay of Bengal.

The Allahabad Pillar inscription mentions that rulers of several frontier kingdoms and tribal oligarchies paid Samudragupta tributes, obeyed his orders, and performed obeisance before him. The frontier kingdoms included Samatata, Davaka, Kamarupa, Nepala, and Karttripura. The tribal oligarchies included Malavas, Arjunayanas, Yaudheyas, Madrakas, and Abhiras, among others.

Finally, the inscription mentions that several foreign kings tried to please Samudragupta  by personal attendance; offered him their daughters in marriage (or according to another interpretation, gifted him maidens); and sought the use of the Garuda-depicting Gupta seal for administering their own territories. This is an exaggeration: for example, the inscription lists the king of Simhala among these kings. It is known that from Chinese sources that the Simhala king Meghavarna sent rich presents to the Gupta king requesting his permission to build a Buddhist monastery at Bodh Gaya: Samudragupta's panegyrist appears to have described this act of diplomacy as an act of subservience.

Samudragupta appears to have been Vaishnavite, as attested by his Eran inscription, and performed several Brahmanical ceremonies. The Gupta records credit him with making generous donations of cows and gold. He performed the Ashvamedha ritual (horse sacrifice), which was used by the ancient Indian kings to prove their imperial sovereignty, and issued gold coins (see Coinage below) to mark this performance.

The Allahabad Pillar inscription presents Samudragupta as a wise king and strict administrator, who was also compassionate enough to help the poor and the helpless. It also alludes to the king's talents as a musician and a poet, and calls him the "king of poets". Such claims are corroborated by Samudragupta's gold coins, which depict him playing a veena.

Samudragupta appears to have directly controlled a large part of the Indo-Gangetic Plain in present-day India, as well as a substantial part of central India. Besides, his empire comprised a number of monarchical and tribal tributary states of northern India, and of the south-eastern coastal region of India.

Ramagupta 

Ramagupta is known from a sixth-century play, the Devichandragupta, in which he surrenders his wife to the enemy Sakas and his brother Chandragupta has to sneak into the enemy camp to rescue her and kill the Saka king. The historicity of these events is unclear, but Ramagupta's existence is confirmed by three Jain statues found at Durjanpur, with inscriptions referring to him as the Maharajadhiraja. A large number of his copper coins also have been found from the Eran-Vidisha region and classified in five distinct types, which include the Garuda, Garudadhvaja, lion and border legend types. The Brahmi legends on these coins are written in the early Gupta style.

Chandragupta II "Vikramaditya"

According to the Gupta records, amongst his sons, Samudragupta nominated prince Chandragupta II, born of queen Dattadevi, as his successor. Chandragupta II, Vikramaditya (Victory of the Sun), ruled from 375 until 415. He married a Kadamba princess of Kuntala and of Naga lineage (Nāgakulotpannnā), Kuberanaga. His daughter Prabhavatigupta from this Naga queen was married to Rudrasena II, the Vakataka ruler of Deccan. His son Kumaragupta I was married to a Kadamba princess of the Karnataka region. Chandragupta II expanded his realm westwards, defeating the Saka Western Kshatrapas of Malwa, Gujarat and Saurashtra in a campaign lasting until 409. His main opponent Rudrasimha III was defeated by 395, and he crushed the Bengal chiefdoms. This extended his control from coast to coast, established a second capital at Ujjain and was the high point of the empire. Kuntala inscriptions indicate rule of Chandragupta in Kuntala region of Indian state of Karnataka. Hunza inscription also indicate that Chandragupta was able to rule north western Indian subcontinent and proceeded to conquer Balkh, although some scholars have also disputed the identity of gupta king. Chalukyan ruler Vikramditya VI (r. 1076 – 1126 CE) mentions Chandragupta with his title and states"why should the glory of the Kings Vikramaditya and Nanda be a hindrance any longer ? he with a loud command abolished that (era), which has the name of Saka, and made that (era) which has the Chalukya counting"

Despite the creation of the empire through war, the reign is remembered for its very influential style of Hindu art, literature, culture and science, especially during the reign of Chandragupta II. Some excellent works of Hindu art such as the panels at the Dashavatara Temple in Deogarh serve to illustrate the magnificence of Gupta art. Above all, it was the synthesis of elements that gave Gupta art its distinctive flavour. During this period, the Guptas were supportive of thriving Buddhist and Jain cultures as well, and for this reason, there is also a long history of non-Hindu Gupta period art. In particular, Gupta period Buddhist art was to be influential in most of East and Southeast Asia. Many advances were recorded by the Chinese scholar and traveller Faxian in his diary and published afterwards.

The court of Chandragupta was made even more illustrious by the fact that it was graced by the Navaratna (Nine Jewels), a group of nine who excelled in the literary arts. Amongst these men was Kālidāsa, whose works dwarfed the works of many other literary geniuses, not only in his own age but in the years to come. Kalidasa was mainly known for his subtle exploitation of the shringara (romantic) element in his verse.

Chandragupta II's campaigns against foreign tribes

The 4th century Sanskrit poet Kalidasa credits Chandragupta Vikramaditya with conquering about twenty-one kingdoms, both in and outside India. After finishing his campaign in East and West India, Vikramaditya (Chandragupta II) proceeded northwards, subjugated the Parasikas, then the Hunas and the Kambojas tribes located in the west and east Oxus valleys respectively. Thereafter, the king proceeded into the Himalaya mountains to reduce the mountain tribes of the Kinnaras, Kiratas, as well as India proper. In one of his works Kalidasa also credits him with the removal of the Sakas from the country. He wrote 'Wasn't it Vikramaditya who drove the Sakas out from the lovely city of Ujjain?'.

The Brihatkathamanjari of the Kashmiri writer Kshemendra states, King Vikramaditya (Chandragupta II) had "unburdened the sacred earth of the Barbarians like the Sakas, Mlecchas, Kambojas, Yavanas, Tusharas, Parasikas, Hunas, and others, by annihilating these sinful Mlecchas completely".

Faxian
Faxian (or Fa Hsien etc.), a Chinese Buddhist, was one of the pilgrims who visited India during the reign of the Gupta emperor Chandragupta II. He started his journey from China in 399 and reached India in 405. During his stay in India up to 411, he went on a pilgrimage to Mathura, Kannauj, Kapilavastu, Kushinagar, Vaishali, Pataliputra, Kashi, and Rajagriha, and made careful observations about the empire's conditions. Faxian was pleased with the mildness of administration. The Penal Code was mild and offences were punished by fines only. From his accounts, the Gupta Empire was a prosperous period. His writings form one of the most important sources for the history of this period.

Faxian on reaching Mathura comments––"The snow and heat are finely tempered, and there is neither hoarfrost nor snow. The people are numerous and happy. They have not to register their households. Only those who cultivate the royal land have to pay (a portion of) the gain from it. If they want to go, they go. If they want to stay on, they stay on. The king governs without decapitation or (other) corporal punishments. Criminals are simply fined according to circumstances. Even in cases of repeated attempts at wicked rebellion, they only have their right-hand cut off. The king's bodyguards & attendants all have salaries. Throughout the whole country, the people do not kill any living creature, not drink any intoxicating liquor, nor eat onions or garlic."

Kumaragupta I

Chandragupta II was succeeded by his second son Kumaragupta I, born of Mahadevi Dhruvasvamini. Kumaragupta I assumed the title, Mahendraditya. He ruled until 455. Towards the end of his reign a tribe in the Narmada valley, the Pushyamitras, rose in power to threaten the empire. The Kidarites as well probably confronted the Gupta Empire towards the end of the rule of Kumaragupta I, as his son Skandagupta mentions in the Bhitari pillar inscription his efforts at reshaping a country in disarray, through reorganisation and military victories over the Pushyamitras and the Hunas.

He was the founder of Nalanda University which on 15 July 2016 was declared as a UNESCO world heritage site. Kumaragupta I was also a worshipper of Kartikeya

Skandagupta

Skandagupta, son and successor of Kumaragupta I is generally considered to be the last of the great Gupta rulers. He assumed the titles of Vikramaditya and Kramaditya. He defeated the Pushyamitra threat, but then was faced with invading Kidarites (sometimes described as the Hephthalites or "White Huns", known in India as the Sweta Huna), from the northwest.

He repelled a Huna attack around 455 CE, but the expense of the wars drained the empire's resources and contributed to its decline. The Bhitari Pillar inscription of Skandagupta, the successor of Chandragupta, recalls the near-annihilation of the Gupta Empire following the attacks of the Kidarites. The Kidarites seem to have retained the western part of the Gupta Empire.

Skandagupta died in 467 and was succeeded by his agnate brother Purugupta.

Decline of the empire

Following Skandagupta's death, the empire was clearly in decline, and the later Gupta coinage indicates their loss of control over much of western India after 467–469. Skandagupta was followed by Purugupta (467–473), Kumaragupta II (473–476), Budhagupta (476–495), Narasimhagupta (495–530), Kumaragupta III (530–540), Vishnugupta (540–550), two lesser known kings namely, Vainyagupta and Bhanugupta.

In the 480's the Alchon Huns under Toramana and Mihirakula broke through the Gupta defences in the northwest, and much of the empire in the northwest was overrun by the Huns by 500. According to some scholars the empire disintegrated under the attacks of Toramana and his successor Mihirakula. It appears from inscriptions that the Guptas, although their power was much diminished, continued to resist the Huns. The Hun invader Toramana was defeated by Bhanugupta in 510. The Huns were defeated and driven out of India in 528 by King Yashodharman from Malwa, and possibly Gupta emperor Narasimhagupta.

These invasions, although only spanning a few decades, had long term effects on India, and in a sense brought an end to Classical Indian civilisation. Soon after the invasions, the Gupta Empire, already weakened by these invasions and the rise of local rulers such as Yashodharman, ended as well. Following the invasions, northern India was left in disarray, with numerous smaller Indian powers emerging after the crumbling of the Guptas. The Huna invasions are said to have seriously damaged India's trade with Europe and Central Asia. In particular, Indo-Roman trade relations, which the Gupta Empire had greatly benefited from. The Guptas had been exporting numerous luxury products such as silk, leather goods, fur, iron products, ivory, pearl, and pepper from centres such as Nasik, Paithan, Pataliputra, and Benares. The Huna invasion probably disrupted these trade relations and the tax revenues that came with them.

Furthermore, Indian urban culture was left in decline, and Buddhism, gravely weakened by the destruction of monasteries and the killing of monks by the hand of the vehemently anti-Buddhist Shaivist Mihirakula, started to collapse. Great centres of learning were destroyed, such as the city of Taxila, bringing cultural regression. During their rule of 60 years, the Alchons are said to have altered the hierarchy of ruling families and the Indian caste system. For example, the Hunas are often said to have become the precursors of the Rajputs.

The succession of the 6th-century Guptas is not entirely clear, but the tail end recognised ruler of the dynasty's main line was king Vishnugupta, reigning from 540 to 550. In addition to the Hun invasion, the factors, which contribute to the decline of the empire include competition from the Vakatakas and the rise of Yashodharman in Malwa.

The last known inscription by a Gupta emperor is from the reign of Vishnugupta (the Damodarpur copper-plate inscription), in which he makes a land grant in the area of Kotivarsha (Bangarh in West Bengal) in 542/543 CE. This follows the occupation of most of northern and central India by the Aulikara ruler Yashodharman circa 532 CE.

A 2019 study by archaeologist Shanker Sharma has concluded that the cause of the Gupta empire's downfall was a devastating flood which happened around the middle of the 6th century in Uttar Pradesh and Bihar.

Post-Gupta successor dynasties
In the heart of the former Gupta Empire, in the Gangetic region, the Guptas were succeeded by the Maukhari dynasty and the Pushyabhuti dynasty. The coinage of the Maukharis and Pushyabhutis followed the silver coin type of the Guptas, with portrait of the ruler in profile (although facing in the reverse direction compared to the Guptas, a possible symbol of antagonism) and the peacock on the reverse, the Brahmi legend being kept except for the name of the ruler.

In the western regions, they were succeeded by the Gurjaras, the Pratiharas, and later the Chaulukya-Paramara dynasties, who issued so-called Indo-Sasanian coinage, on the model of the coinage of the Sasanian Empire, which had been introduced in India by the Alchon Huns.

Military organisation

In contrast to the Mauryan Empire, the Guptas introduced several military innovations to Indian warfare. Chief amongst these was the use of Siege engines, heavy cavalry archers and heavy sword cavalry. The heavy cavalry formed the core of the Gupta army and were supported by the traditional Indian army elements of elephants and light infantry.

The utilisation of horse archers in the Gupta period is evidenced on the coinage of Chandragupta II, Kumaragupta I and Prakasaditya (postulated to be Purugupta) that depicts the emperors as horse-archers.

Unfortunately there is a paucity of contemporary sources detailing the tactical operations of the Imperial Gupta Army. The best extant information comes from the Sanskrit mahakavya (epic poem) Raghuvaṃśa written by the Classical Sanskrit writer and dramatist Kalidasa. Many modern scholars put forward the view that Kalidasa lived from the reign of Chandragupta II to the reign of Skandagupta and that the campaigns of Raghu – his protagonist in the Raghuvaṃśa – reflect those of Chandragupta II. In Canto IV of the Raghuvamsa, Kalidasa relates how the king's forces clash against the powerful, cavalry-centric, forces of the Persians and later the Yavanas (probably Huns) in the North-West. Here he makes special mention of the use horse-archers in the kings army and that the horses needed much rest after the hotly contested battles. The five arms of the Gupta military included infantry, cavalry, chariot, elephants and ships. Gunaighar copper plate inscription of Vainya Gupta mentions ships but not chariots. Ships had become integral part of Indian military in the 6th century AD.

Religion

The Guptas were traditionally a Hindu dynasty. They were orthodox Hindus, and allowed followers of Buddhism and Jainism to practice their religions. Sanchi remained an important centre of Buddhism. Kumaragupta I (455 CE) is said to have founded Nalanda.  Modern genetic studies indicate that it was during the Gupta period that Indian caste groups ceased to intermarry (started practicing/enforcing endogamy).

Some later rulers however seem to have especially promoted Buddhism. Narasimhagupta Baladitya (c. 495–?), according to contemporary writer Paramartha, was brought up under the influence of the Mahayanist philosopher, Vasubandhu. According to the Manjushrimulakalpa (c. 800 CE), king Narasimhsagupta became a Buddhist monk, and left the world through meditation (Dhyana). The Chinese monk Xuanzang also noted that Narasimhagupta Baladitya's son, Vajra, who commissioned a sangharama as well, "possessed a heart firm in faith".

Gupta administration
A study of the epigraphical records of the Gupta empire shows that there was a hierarchy of administrative divisions from top to bottom. The empire was called by various names such as Rajya, Rashtra, Desha, Mandala, Prithvi and Avani. It was divided into 26 provinces, which were styled as Bhukti, Pradesha and Bhoga. Provinces were also divided into Vishayas and put under the control of the Vishayapatis. A Vishayapati administered the Vishaya with the help of the Adhikarana (council of representatives), which comprised four representatives: Nagarasreshesthi, Sarthavaha, Prathamakulika and Prathama Kayastha. A part of the Vishaya was called Vithi. The Gupta also had trading links with the Sassanid and Byzantine Empire.. The four-fold varna system was observed under the Gupta period but caste system was fluid. Brahmins followed non-Brahmanical profession as well. Khastriyas were involved in trade and commerce. The society largely coexisted among themselves.

Legacy

Scholars of this period include Varāhamihira and Aryabhata, who is believed to be the first to consider zero as a separate number, postulated the theory that the Earth rotates about its own axis, and studied solar and lunar eclipses. Kalidasa, who was a great playwright, who wrote plays such as Shakuntala, and marked the highest point of Sanskrit literature is also said to have belonged to this period. The Sushruta Samhita, which is a Sanskrit redaction text on all of the major concepts of ayurvedic medicine with innovative chapters on surgery, dates to the Gupta period.

Doctors also invented several medical instruments, and even performed operations. The Indian numerals which were the first positional base 10 numeral systems in the world originated from Gupta India. The names of the seven days in a week appeared at the start of the Gupta period based on Hindu deities and planets corresponding to the Roman names. The ancient Gupta text Kama Sutra by the Indian scholar Vatsyayana is widely considered to be the standard work on human sexual behaviour in Sanskrit literature.

Aryabhata, a noted mathematician-astronomer of the Gupta period proposed that the earth is round and rotates about its own axis. He also discovered that the Moon and planets shine by reflected sunlight. Instead of the prevailing cosmogony in which eclipses were caused by pseudo-planetary nodes Rahu and Ketu, he explained eclipses in terms of shadows cast by and falling on Earth.

Art and architecture

The Gupta period is generally regarded as a classic peak of North Indian art for all the major religious groups. Although painting was evidently widespread, the surviving works are almost all religious sculpture. The period saw the emergence of the iconic carved stone deity in Hindu art, as well as the Buddha-figure and Jain tirthankara figures, the latter often on a very large scale. The two great centres of sculpture were Mathura and Gandhara, the latter the centre of Greco-Buddhist art. Both exported sculpture to other parts of northern India.

The most famous remaining monuments in a broadly Gupta style, the caves at Ajanta, Elephanta, and Ellora (respectively Buddhist, Hindu, and mixed including Jain) were in fact produced under later dynasties, but primarily reflect the monumentality and balance of Guptan style. Ajanta contains by far the most significant survivals of painting from this and the surrounding periods, showing a mature form which had probably had a long development, mainly in painting palaces. The Hindu Udayagiri Caves actually record connections with the dynasty and its ministers, and the Dashavatara Temple at Deogarh is a major temple, one of the earliest to survive, with important sculpture.

List of rulers

See also 

 Gupta era
 Uchchhakalpa dynasty

References

Bibliography

Notes

External links

 Coins of Gupta Empire

 
Historical Hindu empires
Empires and kingdoms of India
Medieval India
Dynasties of India
Former empires
States and territories established in the 320s
States and territories disestablished in the 550s
4th-century establishments in India
550s disestablishments
6th-century disestablishments in India
3rd-century establishments in Nepal